The Ultimate Collection is a Whitney Houston greatest hits collection, released on October 29, 2007. In Brazil,  the album was released as Whitney Houston – The Best So Far. In 2011, it was reissued as All Time Best - Reclam Musik Edition in Germany and Switzerland.

Unlike the North American edition of her previous singles compilation, Whitney: The Greatest Hits, the upbeat and dance-oriented songs — with the exception of "I'm Your Baby Tonight" — are not remixed and contain the original version of those songs (although a few of the songs appear here as their radio / single edits). The Ultimate Collection was not released in North American territories.

Track listing

Album

DVD

Personnel 

Nick Ashford — composer
John "Jellybean" Benitez — producer
John Bettis — composer
Paul Boutin — engineer
Mariah Carey — vocals
Dana Chappelle — vocal engineer
Linda Creed — composer
LaShawn Daniels — composer
Clive Davis — executive producer
Gary Chanel Debique — design
Jon Douglas — mixing
Jerry Duplessis — composer, producer
Kenneth "Babyface" Edmonds — drum programming, executive producer, keyboards, producer, composer
Toni Estes — composer

David Foster — composer
Jud J. Friedman — composer
Jon Gass — mixing
Brad Gilderman — engineer
Gerry Goffin — composer
Albert Hammond — composer
Whitney Houston — executive producer, vocal arrangement
Chuck Jackson — composer
Wyclef Jean — composer, producer
Will Jennings — composer
Rodney Jerkins — composer, instrumentation, producer
Tom Kelly — composer
Larry Lachmann — mastering
Harvey Mason Jr. — digital editing
Michael Masser — composer, producer

George Merrill — composer
George Michael — producer
Dolly Parton — composer
Isaac Phillips — composer
L.A. Reid — composer, producer
Allan Rich — composer
Shannon Rubicam — composer
Stephen Schwartz — composer
Dexter Simmons — remixing
Valerie Simpson — composer
Billy Steinberg — composer
Ren Swan — mixing
Linda Thompson-Jenner — composer
Narada Michael Walden — arranger, producer
Frank Wildhorn — composer

Charts

The Ultimate Collection

Weekly charts

Monthly charts

Year-end charts

Decade-end charts

All-time charts

All Time Best - Reclam Musik Edition

Weekly charts

Certifications and sales

Album

DVD

See also 
List of number-one hits of 2012 (Austria)
List of number-one albums of 2012 (Ireland)
List of UK R&B Chart number-one albums of 2012
List of albums which have spent the most weeks on the UK Albums Chart
New Zealand top 50 albums of 2012

References

External links 
 The Ultimate Collection at Allmusic
 The Ultimate Collection at Discogs

2007 greatest hits albums
Whitney Houston compilation albums
Albums produced by David Foster
Arista Records albums